Waterways Ireland (Ulster-Scots: Watterweys Airlann) is one of the six all-Ireland North/South implementation bodies established under the Belfast Agreement in 1999. It is responsible for the management, maintenance, development, and restoration of inland navigable waterways primarily for recreational purposes. Included as inland waterways are the Barrow Navigation, the Erne System, the Grand Canal, the Lower Bann, the Royal Canal, the Shannon–Erne Waterway and the Shannon Navigation.

Waterways Ireland has its headquarters in Enniskillen, Northern Ireland, and regional offices in Carrick-on-Shannon, Dublin, and Scarriff in the Republic of Ireland.

The Waterways Ireland Visitor Centre is located at 2 Grand Canal Quay, Ringsend, Dublin. The building was constructed on the waters of the inner basin of Grand Canal Dock.

See also 
 Canals of Ireland
 Rivers of Ireland

References 

Water transport in Ireland
Water transport in Northern Ireland
Waterways organisations in the United Kingdom
British–Irish Agreement implementation bodies
Department of Housing, Local Government and Heritage